Francesco Filippini (18 September 1853 – 6 March 1895) was an Italian painter from Lombardy. He was much influenced by Tranquillo Cremona.

Life 

Filippini was born in Brescia, in Lombardy in northern Italy, on 18 September 1853, into a poor family. His father Lorenzo was a carpenter, his mother Silvia Signoria a seamstress. He was soon sent to work, first as a waiter in a pastry shop, later as a clerk to a notary public.

Filippini attended the school of drawing at the Pinacoteca Tosio; from 1872 he received a grant from the city council to continue these studies. In 1875 he received an allowance to study under Giuseppe Bertini in Milan. In 1879 another grant allowed him to travel to Paris to visit the Salon.

Filippini exhibited at the annual shows of the Accademia di Belle Arti di Brera in Milan from 1879, and from 1880 lived in that city. He made his living by teaching, both in schools and privately. He was made an honorary member of the Accademia di Brera in 1878.

He died in Milan on 6 March 1895.

Work 

When young, Filippini painted mostly religious or historical subjects, as well as some portraits. In later life he painted mostly landscapes – of the Apennines, of Pegli, of Porto Valtravaglia, of the Val Camonica or of the Valle Seriana – or seascapes in Chioggia, Genova, Naples or Venice. His work shows the influence of the Scapigliatura painter Tranquillo Cremona.

Art market
At a Sotheby's Milano auction in 2007, Francesco Filippini's Ai piedi del ghiacciaio  (At the foot of the Glacier, 1875), an oil on canvas, was sold for Euro 102,250 plus auction fees.

References

Further reading 

 Vasco Frati (1999). Francesco Filippini: 1853-1895: un protagonista del naturalismo lombardo (exhibition catalogue, in Italian). Milan:Skira. .

Italian landscape painters
19th-century Italian painters
19th-century Italian male artists
Italian male painters
Painters from Brescia
Brera Academy alumni
1853 births
1895 deaths